Santana is a settlement located in the nation of Belize. It is a mainland village located in Belize District.

Santana is located 34 miles from Belize City. Its population is approximately 110. Farming is still the way of life for many villagers. Dickie Hernandez is the chairman of the Santana water board, which also supplies running water to surrounding villages. 

Populated places in Belize District
Belize Rural North